Draycott in the Moors is a civil parish in the district of Staffordshire Moorlands, Staffordshire, England. It contains twelve listed buildings that are recorded in the National Heritage List for England.  Of these, one is at Grade II*, the middle of the three grades, and the others are at Grade II, the lowest grade.  The parish includes the villages of Draycott in the Moors and Cresswell, and the surrounding area.  The listed buildings consist of houses and farmhouses, two churches with items in the churchyards, and a milepost.


Key

Buildings

References

Citations

Sources

Lists of listed buildings in Staffordshire